The Extended Play is the first release by the band Wintergreen. It was released November 15, 2005 on Mt. Fuji Records.

Track listing
 "Waste of Time" - 3:08
 "When I Wake Up" - 2:18
 "Hard to Be Cool" - 1:47	
 "Last Dance" - 3:45
 "You Belong to Me" - 1:53

External links
Wintergreen official website

2005 albums